Honolulu Civil Beat is a news website that practices journalism related to the U.S. state of Hawaii. Journalists and editors at Civil Beat have traveled to other U.S. held territories and military installations in the Pacific, reporting on current and historical events about immigration and other issues. Civil Beat is headquartered in Honolulu, on the island of Oahu, and is published by Pierre Omidyar, founder of eBay.

History
Omidyar launched Civil Beat May 2010 with a subscription paywall. Its founding editor was Pulitzer Prize winning journalist John Temple, former editor and publisher of The Rocky Mountain News. When Temple left to take a position at the Washington Post in 2009, journalist Patti Epler was promoted to executive editor.

In 2012, Huffington Post launched a Hawaii issues and travel-oriented site in partnership with Civil Beat. HuffPost Hawaii staff share office space with the Civil Beat staff.

In 2012, as part of an investigation of municipal law enforcement, Civil Beat sued the City and County of Honolulu for access to public records. The organization has also provided national pool journalists for visits by President Barack Obama and his family, conducted research and enterprise reporting on Hawaii's homeless population and its high mortality rate, and questioned the high cost to taxpayers of remediation of Kahoolawe island.

The Greater Oregon and the Indiana chapters of the Society of Professional Journalists (SPJ) gave its award for "best overall news site" in Hawaii to Honolulu Civil Beat in 2011 and 2012.  In 2017, editor Richard Wiens announced it had won best online newsite (the Louisville chapter judged 2016), marking 7 years in a row the paper had won the title.

Operation
Civil Beat has a board of directors that includes publisher Pierre Omidyar.

Civil Beat gets revenue from subscriptions along with funding from Pierre Omidyar. Other sponsorships have come from local businesses and nonprofits, such as the law firm of Alston Hunt Floyd & Ing, Appleseed Center and Honolulu Museum of Art which together provided underwriting for a reporting project in Micronesia, and D.R. Horton, which provided underwriting for a series on Hawaii's high cost of living.

In 2016, the publication became a non-profit and its paywall has been dropped.

Besides the partnership with The Huffington Post, Civil Beat has media partnerships with Hawaii Public Radio, KITV and Clear Channel/KHVH. Civil Beat provides content and analysis for other news organizations including National Public Radio.

Articles written by Civil Beat journalists have been featured in the New York Times and are often referenced and quoted in other news sources. Civil Beat staff contribute to local talk radio programs.

Civil Beat's competitors include the state's major newspaper, the Honolulu Star-Advertiser.

References

External links
Honolulu Civil Beat website

Companies based in Honolulu
Internet properties established in 2010
Mass media in Honolulu
American news websites
2010 establishments in Hawaii